Salakau, which means 369 in Hokkien, also known as "Sah Lak Kau", is a street gang or secret society based in Singapore. The numbers 3, 6 and 9 add up to 18, which was the name of an older gang; the number signified the 18 arhats (principal disciples) of Shaolin Monastery. As one of the oldest and most prominent gangs in the country, they are known to take part in many illicit activities such as narcotics, extortion, prostitution and white-collar crime — and many of their members have been in and out of prison for violent attacks and rioting. They have a renowned gang chant sung in Hokkien that's usually accompanied by techno beats. It was reproduced for Royston Tan's teenage gangster flick 15, albeit with direct references to the gang edited out.

History 
From the early 1970s until the late 1980s, Salakau attacked rival gangs and started many turf wars.   Salakau recruited many members from Indian and Malay communities after relaxing the Chinese-only rule. In the 1970s, more Malays were reported to be joining after being introduced to gang members during tea dances in discos. This was because Malay gangs were smaller and less structured due to the drastic drop of the Malay population and increase of the Chinese population.

Salakau also made profits from narcotics, extortion, prostitution, white-collar crime and legitimate businesses.  Attacks on rival gangs such as the '303' gang (Sakongsa in Hokkien), the Omega gang, and the 18 SYH gang were somewhat of a routine occurrence.  The police cracked down on gang activity in the early 1980s and gang wars came to a screeching halt as many of the leaders were jailed.  Many other notorious 'headmen' fled to neighbouring countries or were killed in gang attacks. In the 1990s, some teenagers in "pseudo-street gangs" claimed affiliation to Salakau to be "cool" but did not engage in activities as violent as those engaged in by the real gang; in 1993, there were at least nine separate teenage gangs calling themselves 'Salakau'. However, in the late 1990s and early dawn of the millennium, the gang gained strength as many of the jailed leaders were released, and several of the members had succeeded in scaring off many rival gangs from territories.  Gang attacks once again became common and rioting cases shot up.  Cases of murder involving gang attacks and riots were steadily increasing and the police tightened its noose on the gangs.  Singapore's Secret Society Branch dedicated most of its resources to halt the gang violence and managed stopping a considerable number of members.  Slowly but surely, the gang violence receded and many members were put in prison.

Law enforcement 

Salakau predominantly holds the territories as mentioned, but gang activity has slowed down considerably due to the Singapore Police Force (SPF) having a better understanding of the gang networks and sufficient resources. The Secret Societies Branch (SSB) of the SPF has made efforts to control the secret societies in recent years.  The SSB regularly conducts surprise raids or checks on nightspots, and public places known to be gang territories to deter any potential offenders. Under Singaporean criminal law, a person found guilty of being a member of an unlawful society may be punished up to a maximum of five years imprisonment and five strokes of the cane.  Sentences are usually doubled or even tripled for anyone with significant leadership and authority in any unlawful society in Singapore.

Incidents

Murder of footballer Sulaiman bin Hashim

On 31 May 2001, after celebrating the 18th birthday of one of their members, eight male members of Salakau, all of Malay descent and aged between 18 to 21, decided to launch a surprise attack on rival gang Sakongsa (303), who were roaming around Boat Quay. The gang later spotted three Malay teens walking along Boat Quay and presuming the youths as members of the rival gang, the Salakau, led by 21-year-old Norhisham bin Mohamad Dahlan (born on 18 May 1980), went to attack the three youths and began to grievously assault one of them, leading to the unfortunate teen's death while the two others boys (one of whom was stabbed on the back by a gang member) managed to escape to inform the police. Autopsy results showed that the boy was stabbed a total of 13 times, with two separate fatal knife wounds on his neck and chest.

The three teenagers whom the Salakau gang attacked were in fact not gang members but footballers belonging to the U-18 national team. It was a case of mistaken identity. The murdered victim was identified to be 17-year-old Sulaiman bin Hashim, who was a striker in the team while the other two were his friends, Muhammad Shariff bin Abdul Samat and Mohammed Imran bin Mohammed Ali, both 17. Sulaiman was merely five days away from his 18th birthday when he was killed.

Within more than a year from May 2001 to June 2002, the police managed to arrest six of the eight attackers (including the gang leader, Norhisham), who were all charged with murder, while the remaining two others - identified as Muhammad Syamsul Ariffin bin Brahim and Sharulhawzi bin Ramly respectively - fled Singapore and went on the run till today.

The arrested six members were eventually convicted of lesser charges of rioting, voluntarily causing grievous hurt and culpable homicide not amounting to murder. Five of them (including Norhisham) were sentenced to fixed prison terms ranging between 3 to 10 years and caning between 6 to 16 strokes, while the sixth member, Muhamad Hasik bin Sahar, received the most severe sentence of life imprisonment and 16 strokes of the cane as compared to his five other co-defendants.

Downtown East incident

On 30 October 2010, 19-year-old Darren Ng Wei Jie was injured in a gang fight with members of the Salakau. He was pronounced dead at the hospital after being brought there. 12 youths were arrested and sentenced with corporal punishment and incarceration subsequently, with 5 being charged on culpable homicide for their roles in the attack.

Bukit Panjang incident
On 8 November 2010, seven youths were repeatedly slashed by a group of parang-wielding men in Bukit Panjang, in what appeared to be gang-related attacks. The victims, aged between 14 and 20, were attacked in two separate incidents. The victim of the first incident, a 20-year-old assistant technician, was slashed in the back and legs. The victims of the second incident were a group of 20 youths who were surrounded by the attackers. In both instances, the assailants first asked their victims whether they were from a gang called "Pak Hai Tong". The victims were slashed when they denied association with the group. The gang members shouted "Salakau" before fleeing the scene. The attacker left then-15-year-old Brandon Lim Qian Da hospitalised with a severed tongue while six from the second attack received outpatient treatment for their injuries.

Drug-smuggling by drone
In 2020, two Salakau gang members were arrested by Malaysian police for smuggling illegal drugs from Singapore to Johor Bahru, Malaysia by drone. The arrested person are known as Boy Setan and his girlfriend. Another two people were arrested on a follow up operation on next day for involving in the drug smuggling activities.

See also
Secret societies in Singapore
Secret society

References 

Secret societies in Singapore
Gangs in Singapore